Hosseinieh Azam Zanjan Mosque is one of the Shia Islam religious sites located in Zanjan. This place dates back more than a century ago. This Hoseyniyeh by two people named Mirza Muhammad Taqi and Haj Mirza Babai was dedicated and since was held there since then on the 8th of Muharram mourning a certain way.

Clique 
Great Hoseyniyeh of Zanjan for the clique that each year is the eighth day of Muharram is famous. The clique moves from place simultaneously Great Hoseyniyeh starts and usually ends with the call to Maghrib Athan at the Imamzadeh of Ebarhim. The population of the clique, more than 500 thousand people.

Statistics 
According to the documents Great Hoseyniyeh in just one year and in the way of clique has been offered nearly 13 thousand to 800 million tomans from the people dedicated to Great Hoseyniyeh.

References

External links 
 Official website of  Great Hoseyniyeh of Zanjan
 Meet the Great Hoseyniyeh of Zanjan

Monuments and memorials in Iran
Mosques in Iran
Mosque buildings with domes
National works of Iran
Buildings and structures in Zanjan Province